Eric Caudell (born January 2, 1967) is an American professional stock car racing driver who competes part-time in the ARCA Menards Series and ARCA Menards Series East, driving the No. 7 Ford/Toyota for his team, CCM Racing. He has competed in ARCA since 2015, including running full-time for one season in 2017, where he finished tenth in points. He also made one Truck Series start in 2014 at Iowa.

Racing career

Caudell had raced for many years in the United States Super Truck Series until the series shut down.

Caudell made his Truck Series debut in 2014, driving the No. 12 for Cefalia Motorsports. He finished 28th.

In 2017, Caudell competed in a full season in the ARCA Racing Series in the No. 2 for Hixson Motorsports, a team he previously drove part-time for in the series in 2016. Also, his crew chief that year was Crystal Bates, one of the few female crew chiefs in stock car racing. He ended up finishing tenth in points.

For 2020, it was announced that Caudell and his No. 7 team would be returning to ARCA in ten races: Daytona, Talladega, Chicagoland, Lucas Oil, Elko, Iowa, Springfield, DuQuoin, Bristol, Memphis, and Kansas. In addition, Caudell and his team participated in ARCA's Daytona testing in January 2020 leading up to the race there the following month. Caudell and his former Hixson Motorsports teammate Rick Tackman shared his No. 7 car during the test session.

In 2021, Caudell returned for another part-time schedule in his No. 7 car. He also made his debut in the ARCA Menards Series East (formerly the NASCAR K&N Pro Series East) that year as his schedule included the three combination races (Iowa, Milwaukee, and Bristol) that the main ARCA Series had with the East Series.

Personal life
Caudell graduated from the University of Oklahoma, earning a degree in Management Information Systems.

He lives in Piedmont, Oklahoma and in addition to racing and has worked as an energy trading software consultant for Murphy USA for over twenty years.

Motorsports career results

NASCAR
(key) (Bold – Pole position awarded by qualifying time. Italics – Pole position earned by points standings or practice time. * – Most laps led.)

Camping World Truck Series

ARCA Menards Series
(key) (Bold – Pole position awarded by qualifying time. Italics – Pole position earned by points standings or practice time. * – Most laps led.)

ARCA Menards Series East

 Season still in progress

References

External links
 

NASCAR drivers
ARCA Menards Series drivers
Living people
1967 births
Racing drivers from Oklahoma
People from Canadian County, Oklahoma